Wilford is an unincorporated community in Fremont County, in the U.S. state of Idaho.

History
The first settlement at Wilford was made in 1883. Wilford was officially founded my Thomas Smith. A post office called Wilford was established in 1887, and remained in operation until 1905. The community was named after Leonard Wilford Hardy, a Mormon leader.

In June 1976, most of the buildings in Wilford were swept away by a flood that resulted from the catastrophic failure of the recently built Teton Dam. Soon after the dam's failure it was reported that "154 [Wilford] houses were intact or in pieces, riding the fifteen-mile-an-hour crest" of the flood.

Five residents of Wilford died in the flood.

References

Unincorporated communities in Fremont County, Idaho